Runner of the Mountain Tops: The Life of Louis Agassiz is a children's biography of Louis Agassiz, the nineteenth-century paleontologist and natural scientist, by Mabel Robinson. It tells his life story from his boyhood in Switzerland to his professorship at Harvard.  Illustrated by Lynd Ward, the biography was first published in 1939 and was a Newbery Honor recipient in 1940.

References

External links
Online text of Runner of the Mountain Tops; available also at A Celebration of Women Writers.

1939 children's books
American children's books
American biographies
Newbery Honor-winning works
Books about scientists
Children's history books